Yevgeny Borisovich Rein (born 29 December 1935 in Leningrad, now Saint Petersburg) is a Russian poet and writer, laureate of the State Prize of the Russian Federation (1997). His poetry won the Pushkin Prize of Russia, Tsarskoe Selo Art Prize (1997), or the Russian National Prize - the Poet (2012).

In 1960s, along with Joseph Brodsky, Dmitri Bobyshev, and Anatoly Naiman, he was one of the Akhmatova's Orphans, a well-known poetic group from Leningrad. Since 1979 Rein participated in the publication of "Metropol" almanac. His poems were published in samizdat and Soviet underground papers.

His first book was published in 1984 (The Names of Bridges) after a "careful" censorship. A well-known poet and free-thinker, the elder friend of Joseph Brodsky and Sergei Dovlatov, he became a member of Russian Writer's Union only in 1987, during the perestroika.

Rein now lives in Moscow. He teaches at the Department of Literary Creativity at the Gorky Literary Institute.

Books
Selected poems (preface by J. Brodsky, V. Kulle, M., SPb, 2001
It's boring without Dovlatov, SPb, 1997

External links
Evgeny Rein on Poetry International Web
Yevgeny  Rein. Selected poems. Preface by Joseph Brodsky. Edited by Valentina Polukhina 
Poetry by Yevgeny  Rein (Russian)
Yevgeny  Rein at the wilsonquarterly.com
The Independent Turn in Soviet-Era Russian Poetry: How Dmitry Bobyshev, Joseph Brodsky, Anatoly Naiman and Yevgeny  Rein Became the 'Avvakumites' of Leningrad

1935 births
Living people
Soviet male poets
Soviet Jews
Russian Jews

Writers from Saint Petersburg
Pushkin Prize winners